Eucalyptus sweedmaniana is a sprawling to prostrate mallee that is endemic to a small area in the Cape Arid National Park in Western Australia. It has smooth, silvery grey bark, broadly lance-shaped, glossy green adult leaves, single red, pendulous flower buds in leaf axils, pink flowers and prominently winged fruit.

Description
It has smooth, shiny silvery grey bark that fades to dull grey. The flower buds are arranged singly in leaf axils on a down-curved, winged peduncle. The mature flower buds are red, square in cross section with prominent wings, with a red, pyramid-shaped operculum. Flowering has been observed from November to February and the flowers are pink.

Taxonomy
Eucalyptus sweedmaniana was first formally described in 2009 by Stephen Hopper and Nathan K. McQuoid and the description was published in Australian Systematic Botany from a specimen in the Cape Arid National Park in 2006. The specific epithet (sweedmaniana) honours Luke Sweedman, a former curator of the Western Australian Seed Technology Centre, Western Australian Botanic Garden, Kings Park and Botanic Garden.

Distribution
This mallee is only known from the lower coastal slopes of Mount Arid where it is exposed to significant salt spray.

Conservation
Eucalyptus sweedmaniana is classified as "Priority Two" by the Western Australian Government Department of Parks and Wildlife meaning that it is poorly known and from only one or a few locations.

See also
List of Eucalyptus species

References

sweedmaniana
Endemic flora of Western Australia
Myrtales of Australia
Eucalypts of Western Australia
Plants described in 2009
Taxa named by Stephen Hopper